Honeymoon Bay is a small bay facing the Pacific Ocean, located at the northeast coast of Taiwan in Toucheng Township, Yilan County. Southeast of the bay is Guishan Island, famous to Taiwanese people. Recently, this bay became popular among Taiwanese and foreign surfers. It can be reached by taking the train to nearby Daxi Station of the Taiwan Railway Administration (TRA) and then walking for about 10 minutes.

Geography and activities 

The bay has the shape of a half Moon. The northern and southern shores of the bay are rocky, while in between there is a beach covered with fine, dark-gray sand.

Several hundred meters from the seashore, the undersea topography varies a lot, causing waves 2 to 3 meters high. Such waves hit the bay repeatedly, making surfing a common activity here. There are also several stalls for teaching surfing.

The beach is a good place for non-surfing activities, such as beach volleyball. However, it suffers from a littering problem.

There were some minor music festivals in summer here during the past few years.

Nearby landmarks 
 Hexing (Gallant) Village (a.k.a. Hexing Community) 合興富麗農漁村(合興社區)
 Daxi Elementary School of Toucheng Township, Yilan County, Taiwan 宜蘭縣頭城鎮大溪國小
 Daxi Station 大溪車站

External links 

 National Northeast Coastal Scenic Area — Honeymoon Bay
 蜜月灣 Honeymoon Bay
 UrMap — an image of Formosa-2 Satellite

Bays of Taiwan
Landforms of Yilan County, Taiwan
Tourist attractions in Yilan County, Taiwan